Český les Protected Landscape Area (abbreviated as Český les PLA; , abbreviated as CHKO Český les) is a protected landscape area in the Czech Republic. It lies in the western part of the Plzeň Region along the border with the German state of Bavaria. It protects the most valuable parts of the Upper Palatinate Forest mountain range.

Český les PLA was declared in 2005 as the 25th protected landscape area of the Czech Republic. Most of the area was vacated after the forced expulsion of the predominantly German inhabitants after the World War II. Until the fall of the Communist regime in 1989 it was part of the Western border zone, virtually uninhabited. Due to this development it is today an area little affected by human activities, a mosaic of deep forests, meadows and forests. There are many valuable well-preserved habitats of the beech and mixed fir-beech forests (though replaced by spruce plantations in a large part of the original area), bog spruce forests and bog Mountain Pine forests.

There are no permanent settlements in the area, rather a few restored hamlets and many of the meadows and pastures are now used for cattle raising. The protected area is divided in two parts separated by the D5 highway connecting the Czech Republic and Germany. The zone close to the highway was not included in the protected area.

Small-scale protected areas
As of February 2007 there were following nature reserves and other small-scale protected areas within the Český les PLA:

Resources

External links

Protected landscape areas in the Czech Republic
Protected areas in Plzeň Region